Activating transcription factor 2, also known as ATF2, is a protein that, in humans, is encoded by the ATF2 gene.

Function 
This gene encodes a transcription factor that is a member of the leucine zipper family of DNA-binding proteins. This protein binds to the cAMP-responsive element (CRE), an octameric palindrome. The protein forms a homodimer or heterodimer with c-Jun. The protein is also a histone acetyltransferase (HAT) that specifically acetylates histones H2B and H4 in vitro; thus, it may represent a class of sequence-specific factors that activate transcription by direct effects on chromatin components. Additional transcript variants have been identified but their biological validity has not been determined.

The gene atf2 is located at human chromosome 2q32. The protein ATF-2 has 505 amino acids. Studies in mice indicate a role for ATF-2 in the development of nervous system and the skeleton. ATF-2 is normally activated in response to signals that converge on stress-activated protein kinases p38 and JNK. ATF-2 phosphorylation in response to treatment of cells with tumor promoter phorbol ester has been demonstrated.

Several studies implicate abnormal activation of ATF-2 in growth and progression of mammalian skin tumors. ATF-2 may mediate oncogenesis caused by mutant Ras protein and regulate maintenance of the aggressive cancer phenotype of some types of epithelial cells.

ATF2 has also been shown to be phosphorylated at its C-terminal (serine 472 and 480 in mouse; serine 490 and 498 in human) by ATM upon double-stranded breaks. Mice with mutations of these two serines are sensitive to irradiation and easier to tumorigenesis under p53 knockout background.

Interactions 

Activating transcription factor 2 has been shown to interact with 
 C-jun,
 Casein kinase 2, alpha 1,
 CREB binding protein,
 CSNK2A2,
 JDP2,
 MAPK14,
 MAPK8,
 Mothers against decapentaplegic homolog 3
 NCOA6,
 RUVBL2,
 UBE2I.

See also 
 Activating transcription factor

References

External links

Further reading

External links 
 PDBe-KB provides an overview of all the structure information available in the PDB for Human Cyclic AMP-dependent transcription factor ATF-2

Transcription factors
Moonlighting proteins